USS Bristol (DD 453) was a  of the United States Navy, named for Rear Admiral Mark Lambert Bristol. She was launched 25 July 1941 by Federal Shipbuilding, Kearny, New Jersey; sponsored by Mrs. Powell Clayton.The destroyer was commissioned on 22 October 1941.

Service history
During her first year of service Bristol operated as a patrol and convoy escort in the North Atlantic, making several trans-Atlantic voyages to Ireland. On 22 September 1942, Cmdr John Albert Glick took over command of the ship. On 24 October 1942, she made her first voyage to North Africa, as part of the Operation Torch landings at Fedala, French Morocco (8–17 November). Returning to the United States in late November, she operated out of Norfolk, Virginia until 14 January 1943, when she again steamed to the Mediterranean where, with the exception of one trip to the Panama Canal Zone in April 1943, she served exclusively until 13 October 1943.

While on duty in that area, she took part in Operation Husky (9 July – 17 August 1943) and the Salerno landings (9–21 September). On 11 September 1943, Bristol rescued 70 survivors from the torpedoed destroyer . While performing shore bombardment during the same operation, she destroyed the Italian Navy armed train ("treno armato") T.A. 76/2/T around the port of Licata.

At 04:30 on 13 October 1943, while escorting a convoy to Oran, Algeria, Bristol was struck on the port side at the forward engine room by a single torpedo from U-boat  commanded by Waldemar Mehl. Bristol was broken in half by the single explosion. No fires resulted, but steam, electrical power, and communications were lost and the ship had to be abandoned. Eight minutes after the explosion the aft section sank, followed four minutes later by the foreparts.

Convoys escorted

Awards
Bristol received three battle stars for her World War II service.

References

External links
    navsource.org: USS Bristol
        hazegray.org: USS Bristol

World War II destroyers of the United States
World War II shipwrecks in the Mediterranean Sea
Ships built in Kearny, New Jersey
1941 ships
Gleaves-class destroyers of the United States Navy
Maritime incidents in October 1943
Ships sunk by German submarines in World War II